Like Minds is a 2006 Australian thriller film written and directed by Gregory J. Read. The film was produced by the South Australian Film Corporation. It debuted in Australia on 9 November 2006.  The psychological thriller is the first Australian/UK co-production to be set in the UK in over a decade. Like Minds was retitled Murderous Intent for its 2007 U.S. DVD release.

Plot
Alex Forbes attends a boarding school where his father is principal. A new student, Nigel Colbie, is placed in Alex's room. Nigel has a father who is in the same secret society as Alex's father. Nigel, however, is unusual, and in Alex's words "had this morbid fascination with all things dead." Nigel keeps animals preserved in jars, and dissects them. Alex complains to his father, and Nigel is moved. But Alex can't seem to stop thinking about him. He does, however, start to flirt with a girl named Susan, whom Nigel kills. Later on, Nigel explained that there are a series of things that must happen for them to gain "eternity."

Cast
 Eddie Redmayne as Alex Forbes
 Tom Sturridge as Nigel Colbie
 Toni Collette as Sally Rowe
 Richard Roxburgh as Sn. Dt. Martin McKenzie
 Cathryn Bradshaw as Helen Colbie
 Kate Maberly as Susan Mueller
 Patrick Malahide as Headmaster
 Jon Overton as George Campbell
 Henry Hereford as Tom Horsham

Production
The film was shot on location in Yorkshire, England. and South Australia. Scenes in the hall were filmed in Bradford Grammar School, Bradford. The school chapel scenes were filmed outside and inside the chapel of Giggleswick School, near Settle, in North Yorkshire.

Box office
Like Minds grossed $34,840 at the box office in Australia.

See also
Cinema of Australia

References

External links
 
 Like Minds at Arclight Films
 Like Minds at the National Film and Sound Archive

Australian horror films
2006 films
British thriller films
Films shot in Adelaide
2000s English-language films
2000s British films
2000s Australian films